The Adventures of Buratino (tr.:Priklyucheniya Buratino) is a 1959 Soviet traditionally animated feature film directed by the "patriarch of Russian animation", Ivan Ivanov-Vano, along with Dmitriy Babichenko and Mikhail Botov. It was produced at the Soyuzmultfilm studio in Moscow and is based on Aleksey Nikolayevich Tolstoy’s The Golden Key, or Adventures of Buratino.

Plot
The film tells about the adventures of a small wooden puppet whose youngest viewers are familiar with the book where Carlo Collodi tells the adventures of Pinocchio. In fact, Burattino is a puppet in the first version of the novel.

English dubs
In 1984, an English dub of the film was recorded at Jim Terry Productions (the same people behind the first English dub of the Pinocchio anime). This dub was released on subsequent VHS tapes throughout the 80s and early 90s. A second attempt at an English dub commenced in 1990, and a third in 1995 by Films by Jove for the series Stories from My Childhood.

DVD releases
Films by Jove, May 18, 1999 (R1?, NTSC) - version restored by Films by Jove in the 1990s. Titled Stories from My Childhood, Vol. 2. It contains English, French and Spanish soundtracks, no subtitles. Included films: Ivan and His Magic Pony (aka. The Humpbacked Horse), Pinocchio and the Golden Key (aka. The Adventures of Buratino).
Krupnyy Plan, 2002 (R5, PAL) - version restored by Krupnyy Plan ("full restoration of image and sound"). It contains original Russian soundtrack, no subtitles. Included film: The Adventures of Buratino. Other features: Before and after restoration, photo album, director filmographies.
Films by Jove, 2006 (R0?, NTSC) - version restored by Films by Jove in the 1990s. It contains Russian soundtrack with English subtitles. Included films: The Adventures of Buratino, The Boy from Neapolis (Мальчик из Неаполя), Chipollino (Чиполино'').

Creators

Awards
Minsk, 1960 - First prize in the animated film category

See also

History of Russian animation
List of animated feature-length films

External links
The Adventures of Buratino at animator.ru (English and Russian)

 (Official Russian)
The Adventures of Buratino at myltik.ru

DVDs
The Adventures of Buratino at Krupnyy Plan 
Review of Krupnyy Plan DVD (with pictures) 

1959 films
Soviet animated films
Films directed by Ivan Ivanov-Vano
Pinocchio films
Soyuzmultfilm
1959 animated films
Animated films based on children's books
1950s Russian-language films